Neoniphon aurolineatus, more commonly known as the yellowstriped squirrelfish or gold-lined squirrelfish, is a member of the family Holocentridae. It has a wide range throughout the Indian and Pacific Oceans stretching east from Mauritius to Hawaii and south from Japan to the Great Barrier Reef of Australia. It lives near the ocean floor or in caves, generally staying alone or in small groups. It feeds on crustaceans and can reach sizes of up to  TL. It is listed as "Least Concern" by the IUCN due to its deep-water habitat and lack of known major threats.

References

External links
 Fishes of Australia : Neoniphon aurolineatus

yellowstriped squirrelfish
Fauna of Queensland
yellowstriped squirrelfish